The 2013–14 season was the 90th season in the existence of AEK Athens F.C. and the first in the third tier of Greek football. They competed in the Football League 2 and the Football League 2 Cup. The season began on 22 September 2013 and finished on 21 May 2014.

Overview
On 9 June 2013, Dimitris Melissanidis, the then potential owner of OPAP, won the AEK Athens' elections with his party called Regeneration of AEK and became the owner of the club. The elections happened to the amateur AEK and not AEK S.A., since the club ceased being an S.A. by getting relegated to Football League 2, the top amateur division in Greek football. The team did not wear last season's kit in the friendlies, since they did not want to remember the kit which was marked by the worst season in the history of the club. It was the first season of the club's history that did not play in the highest domestic tier. Because of that, the club also did not participate in Greek Cup or in AFCA Cup, but in Football League 2 Cup.

Events

 9 June: Dimitris Melissanidis' supported party, Regeneration of AEK wins the amateur AEK elections. The club chairman became Vangelis Aslanidis.
 10 June: AEK former player, Vasilis Dimitriadis, becomes the football club operations manager.
 11 June: Topographers appear in Nea Filadelfeia so that the procedures for the creation of the new ground get going.
 13 June: The club signs Edin Murga.
 14 June: Dimitrios Grontis signs a three-year contract for the club, willing to help AEK return where they belong.
 17 June: Stavros Stathakis signs a three-year contract as well, claiming that the club will be back in two years.
 17 June: Miguel Cordero, one of the best players of the club last season, is announced that has signed for four years with the club.
 19 June: Giorgos Katidis signs for Novara Calcio.
 19 June: Ilias Vouras signs for four years with the club.
 26 June: The club officially enters the liquidation process, which is required for the team to participating in Football League 2.
 4 September: The club wins Chrisostomia Tournament, held by Triglia Rafinas. Apollon Smyrnis and Panionios also played in the tournament.
 4 January 2014: Michalis Pavlis announced his retirement from professional football, aged 24, due to multiple sclerosis.
 24 January 2014 AEK were deducted 3 points, 2 games behind closed doors and 2,500 € fine after violations at the match against Egaleo on 5 January 2014 at Stavros Mavrothalassitis Stadium, Egaleo. Egaleo was also penalised the same way.

Players

Squad information

NOTE: The players are the ones that have been announced by the AEK Athens' press release. No edits should be made unless a player arrival or exit is announced. Updated 30 June 2014, 23:59 UTC+3.

Transfers

In

Summer

Out

Summer

 a.  Leipzig paid €50K to AEK Athens for the player's expenses.

Winter

Loan out

Summer

Winter

Renewals

Overall transfer activity

Spending
Summer:  €500,000

Winter:  €0

Total:  €500,000

Income
Summer:  €0

Winter:  €0

Total:  €0

Expenditure
Summer:  €500,000

Winter:  €0

Total:  €500,000

Pre-season and friendlies

Football League 2

Group 6 League Table

Results summary

Results by Matchday

Fixtures

Football League 2 Cup

Matches
AEK Athens advanced to Matchday 2 on walkover.

Statistics

Squad statistics

! colspan="11" style="background:#FFDE00; text-align:center" | Goalkeepers
|-

! colspan="11" style="background:#FFDE00; color:black; text-align:center;"| Defenders
|-

! colspan="11" style="background:#FFDE00; color:black; text-align:center;"| Midfielders
|-

! colspan="11" style="background:#FFDE00; color:black; text-align:center;"| Forwards
|-

! colspan="11" style="background:#FFDE00; color:black; text-align:center;"| From U-17
|-

! colspan="11" style="background:#FFDE00; color:black; text-align:center;"| Left during Winter Transfer Window
|-

|-
|}

Disciplinary record

|-
! colspan="14" style="background:#FFDE00; text-align:center" | Goalkeepers

|-
! colspan="14" style="background:#FFDE00; color:black; text-align:center;"| Defenders

|-
! colspan="14" style="background:#FFDE00; color:black; text-align:center;"| Midfielders

|-
! colspan="14" style="background:#FFDE00; color:black; text-align:center;"| Forwards

|-
! colspan="14" style="background:#FFDE00; color:black; text-align:center;"| From U-17

|-
! colspan="14" style="background:#FFDE00; color:black; text-align:center;"| Left during Winter Transfer window

|-
|}

Starting 11

Goalscorers

Last updated: 31 July 2014

References

External links
AEK Athens F.C. Official Website

2013-14
Greek football clubs 2013–14 season